Marel is a multi-national food processing company based in Iceland. The company manufactures and provides equipment, systems, software and services to the poultry, meat and fish processing industries. Marel is a large manufacturer of food processing equipment for primary, secondary, and tertiary processing. The company employs approximately 6,000 people in offices and subsidiaries in over 30 countries, across six continents. The company is headquartered in Garðabær, Iceland.

History
Marel was founded in 1983 when some young engineers at the University of Iceland began to experiment with electronics and early computers. Rögnvaldur Ólafsson, Jón Þór Ólafsson, Pétur Jónsson, and Tómas Ríkarðsson identified the needs of many fish processors in Iceland to quickly and accurately weigh fish as they were being processed to minimize the giveaway of product, and withstand the harsh and wet conditions of fish processing plants.

The Marel engineers focused on implementing early computer technology into food processing equipment, an area where it had not been used extensively. The design plan was to have an array of interconnected systems to increase automation in food processing.

Products
Marel develops, manufactures, sells, and distributes equipment, further processing equipment, software and services for the poultry, fish and meat industries. Marel's poultry processing sector offers integrated systems for processing broilers, turkeys, and ducks. The Marel Fish Processing segment provides equipment and systems for farmed and wild salmon and whitefish processing. Marel's Meat Processing division offers systems and equipment for the processes of slaughtering, deboning and trimming, case-ready food services, and bacon processing. Marel also offers wastewater treatment equipment designed specifically for the food industry, and packing and logistics products.

Corporation
The Marel brand was established in 1983 and went public on the Icelandic Stock Exchange in 1992. The listing in 1992 marked Marel's progress from a startup that exclusively focused on the fishing industry, to a global company with operations in diverse industries.

In 2007, Marel changed its corporate identity to Marel Food Systems after acquiring four new brands in 2006: AEW Delford, Carnitech, Marel and Scanvaegt. The acquisition of these companies significantly increased the size of Marel's operations around the world. On January 1, 2010, Marel Food Systems hf. changed their name back to Marel hf. after their integration with Stork Food Systems of the Netherlands was completed. This was part of Marel's strategy to integrate all of the companies they acquired throughout the years under a common identity and company name.

In conjunction with the sale, Marel also acquired MPS's intra-logistics systems for food industries and industrial wastewater treatment systems. MPS has headquarters in the Netherlands, with production sites in the Netherlands and China.

In July 2017, Marel acquired Sulmaq in Brazil to expand its operations in South and Central America. Brazil is the second-largest producer of beef and the third-largest producer of poultry products in the world. Sulmaq is based in the state of Rio Grande do Sul in southern Brazil and employs approximately 400 people. Sulmaq's processing operations include hog slaughtering, cattle slaughtering, cutting and deboning, viscera processing and logistics.

On August 14, 2018, Marel finalized the acquisition of German-based manufacturer of processing equipment MAJA. Under the MAJA acquisition, Marel has acquired a more diverse product line-up and a more extensive global distribution network. In October 2019 Marel acquired Cedar Creek Company, an Brisbane, Australian provider of specialized software and hardware equipment for meat, seafood and poultry processors. In November 2019 Marel finalized a 40% share in Curio ehf, an Icelandic-based manufacturer of advanced equipment for whitefish processing. Marel will acquire an additional 10% of the company on 1 January 2021 with the option to acquire the remaining 50% of shares in four years. Both companies have a long history of collaboration and Curio will now be part of Marel's sales and service network to extend their global reach.

On June 7, 2019, Marel had its initial public offering on the Euronext Amsterdam stock exchange (ticker symbol: MAREL). Amsterdam was a logical choice for the second listing of Marel shares as the company already has a strong presence in the Netherlands where 1/3 of its employees are based.

Árni Oddur Þórðarson has been the Chief Executive Officer of Marel hf since 2013. Prior to becoming CEO, Árni was the Chairman of Marel's Board of Directors from 2005 to October 31, 2013.

Key acquisitions dates

 1997 – Marel acquires Carnitech in Denmark
 2002 – Marel acquires CP Food Machinery
 2004 – Marel acquires Pols in Iceland
 2006 – Marel acquires AEW Delford in the UK
 2006 – Marel acquires Scanvaegt in Denmark
 2008 – Marel acquires Stork Food Systems in the Netherlands together with Townsend, owned by Stork
 2016 – Marel acquires MPS in the Netherlands
 2017 – Marel acquires Sulmaq in Brazil
 2018 – Marel acquires MAJA in Germany
 2019 – Marel acquires Cedar Creek of Brisbane, Australia and Curio ehf, Hafnarfjörður, Iceland
 2021 – Marel announces acquisition of Valka
 2022 - Marel acquires Wenger in the USA

Recognitions
In 2012 Marel was awarded the EuroTier Gold Award for their contribution in environmental conservation and product safety for poultry processing. The American Meat Institute named Marel their supplier of the year in 2013. In 2014, Marel Stork Poultry Processing won an award in the category of Processing with their "New reference in whole product distribution". Marel also received the most public votes at the event, making them the overall winner of the VIV Europe 2014 innovation award.

In Georgia, USA, Marel Stork Poultry Processing was recognized in 2014 by Gainesville-Hall County in their Industry of the Year Awards. In October 2017, Marel's "Robot with a Knife" won the Food Processing Award in the category of "Robotics and Automation".

References

External links 
 

Companies listed on Nasdaq Iceland
Icelandic brands
Manufacturing companies of Iceland
Companies established in 1983
Food processing